Herbert J. Taylor (18 April 1893 – 1 May 1978) was an American business executive, civic leader and sponsor of Christian organizations. He co-founded the Christian Workers Foundation (CWF) in 1939. He served on the boards of several such institutions including Inter-Varsity Christian Fellowship (U.S.A.), Youth for Christ, Young Life, Fuller Seminary, Child Evangelism Fellowship, Christian Service Brigade, Pioneer Girls, and the Chicago Billy Graham Crusades. He was vice-chairman of the Price Adjustment Board of the War Department during World War II; the other positions he held were the presidency of Rotary International, 1954–55; directorship positions for the First National Bank of Barrington (Illinois) and the Chicago Federal Savings and Loan Association; and membership on the Board of Governors of the Illinois Crippled Children Society, 1941–42. Taylor also authored "The Four-Way Test", "The Ten Marks of a Good Citizen", "The Twelve Marks of a True Christian", and "God Has A Plan For You". He has been inducted into the American National Business Hall of Fame. He featured on the cover of Newsweeks 28 February 1955 issue.

A Methodist, he and his wife had two daughters, Gloria Beverly and Romona Estellene. He lived in Park Ridge, Illinois. Herbert Taylor died on 1 May 1978. At the time of his death he was Chairman of board emeritus of Club Aluminium Products Inc.

The Four-Way Test
In the early 1930s Taylor set out to save the Club Aluminum Products distribution company from bankruptcy. He believed himself to be the only person in the company with 250 employees who had hope. His recovery plan started with changing the ethical climate of the company. He explained

Adoption of the test by Rotary

In 1940s, when Taylor was an international director of Rotary, he offered the Four Way Test to the organization, and it was adopted by Rotary for its internal and promotional use. Never changed, the twenty four word Four Way Test remains today a central part of the permanent Rotary structure throughout the world, and is held as the standard by which all behaviour should be measured. The Four Way Test has been promoted around the world and is used in myriad forms to encourage personal and business ethical practices. Taylor gave Rotary International the right to use the test in the 1940s and the copyright in 1954. He retained the rights to use the test for himself, his Club Aluminum Company and the Christian Workers Foundation.

References

External links 
 Herbert J. Taylor Papers, Billy Graham Center Archives, Wheaton College. 

Rotary International leaders
People from Sault Ste. Marie, Michigan
1893 births
1978 deaths